Daule, Guayas, Ecuador is a city located in central Guayas, Ecuador, on the Daule River. It is the seat of Daule Canton, created November 26 of 1820.

At the 2007 census there were 125,358 people living within canton limits, thus is one of the most important cities in the province. The main crop is rice.

Every September 14 in Daule people celebrate "El Señor de Los Milagros" festival. That day people go to the church called El Señor de los Milagros and at night to watch fireworks. Daule was the name of the indigenous tribe called Daulis.

On February 2, 2022, Pope Francis erected the new Roman Catholic Diocese of Daule.

References

Populated places in Guayas Province